Shorea rugosa, called (along with some other species in the genus Shorea) dark red meranti, is a species of plant in the family Dipterocarpaceae. It is native to Borneo and Sumatra. It is a Vulnerable species threatened by habitat loss.

References

rugosa
Flora of Borneo
Flora of Sumatra
Taxonomy articles created by Polbot